Kandelia is a plant genus of two species in the mangrove family Rhizophoraceae.

Description
Kandelia species grow as small mangrove trees. Inflorescences bear 4 to 9 flowers. The fruits are ovoid.

Distribution and habitat
Kandelia species grow in India, China, Japan, Burma, Thailand, Vietnam, Sumatra, Peninsular Malaysia and Borneo. Their habitat is mangrove areas.

Species
 The Plant List and Tropicos recognise 2 species:
 Kandelia candel  
 Kandelia obovata

References

Rhizophoraceae
Malpighiales genera
Mangroves